Member Of Service (M.O.S.) is a term used in parts of the US for any first responder such as a police officer, firefighter, correction officer, emergency medical technician or paramedic. Originally used as an exclusive term by the New York City Police Department, its use has expanded throughout the northeast to identify other types of emergency responders. The term is primarily used to identify an emergency responder in need of assistance.  The M.O.S. in question may have been in a motor vehicle accident, an assault or shooting. The units responding usually get this information from their dispatcher after receiving a 911 or radio call for "M.O.S. needs help".

References

Emergency services in the United States